The 1935 UCI Road World Championships took place in Floreffe, Belgium.

Events Summary

References

 
UCI Road World Championships by year
W
R
R